The 1892 New Jersey gubernatorial election was held on November 8, 1892. Democratic nominee George Theodore Werts defeated Republican nominee John Kean with 49.65% of the vote.

General election

Candidates
Benjamin Bird, (Populist)
John Kean, chair of the New Jersey Republican Party and former U.S. Representative (Republican)
George B. Keim, (Socialist Labor)
Thomas J. Kennedy, (Prohibition)
George Theodore Werts, State Senator for Morris County and President of the New Jersey Senate (Democratic)

Results

References

1892
New Jersey
Gubernatorial
November 1892 events